Barzani at times Barazani may refer to:

Places
Barzan, Iraq, a town in South Kurdistan

People

See also
 Barzani (tribe)
Barzani Jewish Neo-Aramaic, a dialect spoken by Kurdish Jews
Barzani (surname)